The Amir Khusrou Balkhi Library is a library in Afghanistan. In the 1990s, it held about 20,000 books, journals, newspapers and rare books. Materials were focused in history, literature, geography, and religion.

See also 
 List of libraries in Afghanistan

References 

Libraries in Afghanistan